Lophognathus gilberti, Gilbert's lashtail or Gilbert's dragon, is a species of agama found in Australia.

References

Lophognathus
Agamid lizards of Australia
Taxa named by John Edward Gray
Reptiles described in 1842